The Botswana Railways Amalgamated Workers' Union (BRAWU) is a trade union affiliate of the Botswana Federation of Trade Unions in Botswana.

References

Botswana Federation of Trade Unions
Railway labor unions
Organisations based in Gaborone
Transport trade unions in Botswana